

Portugal
 Angola – Caetano Alexandre de Almeida e Albuquerque, Governor-General of Angola (1876–1878)

United Kingdom
 Malta Colony – Charles van Straubenzee, Governor of Malta (1872–1878)
 New South Wales – Hercules Robinson, Lord Rosmead, Governor of New South Wales (1872–1879)
 Queensland 
 William Cairns, Governor of Queensland (1875–1877)
 Sir Arthur Kennedy, Governor of Queensland (1877–1883)
 Tasmania – Major Frederick Weld, Governor of Tasmania (1875–1880)
 South Australia 
 Sir Anthony Musgrave, Governor of South Australia (1873–1877)
 Lieutenant-General William Jervois, Governor of South Australia (1877–1883)
 Victoria – George Bowen, Governor of Victoria (1873–1879)
 Western Australia
 Sir William Robinson, Governor of Western Australia (1875–1877)
 Major-General Harry Ord, Governor of Western Australia (1877–1880)

Colonial governors
Colonial governors
1877